Georgia competed in the Junior Eurovision Song Contest 2022 in Armenia, which was held on 11 December 2022 in Yerevan. The children's talent show  was used for the fifth year in a row to select Georgia's representative, Mariam Bigvava.

Background 

In the 2021 contest, Niko Kajaia represented Georgia with the song "Lets Count The Smiles" following his victory in the fourth season of Ranina, achieving 4th place out of 19 with 163 points.

Before Junior Eurovision

Ranina 
Georgian broadcaster GPB confirmed that  would be used for the fifth time on 18 November 2021. The list of participants competing in the show was revealed on 3 April 2022, confirming that the show would once again have 10 competitors. On 5 April, GBP announced that Ranina will kick off on Saturday 16 April.

Round 1 
The shows of round 1 took place on 16 and 23 April 2022. The jurors for this round were Maka Aroshidze, Davit Evgenidze and Tamar Skvitaridze. All contestants except Kato Chkareuli, Oto Bazerashvili and Nini Gazdeliani performed with former Ranina participants, such as: Anastasia Garsevanishvili (2019); Nia Khinchikashvili, Sandra Gadelia, Lela Kveniashvili, Marita Khvedelidze and Rati Gelovani (2020); Barbare Makhatadze and Niko Kajaia (2021).

Round 2 
The shows of round 2 took place on 30 April and 7 May 2022. The jurors for this round were Maia Mikarebidze, Davit Evgenidze and Teona Tsiramua.

Round 3 
The shows of round 3 took place on 14 and 21 May 2022. The jurors for this round were Natalia Kutatelidze, Davit Evgenidze and Liza Bagrationi.

Round 4 
The shows of round 4 took place on 28 May and 4 June 2022. The jurors for this round were Buka Kartozia, Davit Evgenidze and Tika Rukhadze.

Semi-final qualification 
At the end of Show 8, the semi-finalists were announced. The five participants who collected the most points throughout the four tours advanced to the next round. They are Alisa Parulava, Nikoloz Kharati, Mariam Bigvava, Sandro Kvachadze, Vache Ghviniashvili and Oto Bazerashvili. Vache Ghviniashvili and Oto Bazerashvili both took 5th place with the same score, so both of them qualified to the semi-final round.

Semi-final 
The semi-final took place on 11 June 2022. The jurors for this round were Dato Tsintsadze, Davit Evgenidze and Nato Metonidze. At the end of the semi-final, the finalists were announced. For the first time in the history of Ranina, four finalists were selected instead of the usual three.

Final 
The final took place on 18 June 2022. The jurors for the final were Beka Gochiashvili, Davit Evgenidze and Nato Metonidze.

Preparation 
On 29 October 2022, GPB reported from the filming of the music video for Mariam's song, featuring four dancers.

At Junior Eurovision 
After the opening ceremony, which took place on 5 December 2022, it was announced that Georgia would perform eighth on 11 December 2022, following Albania and preceding Ireland.

Voting

Detailed voting results

References 

Junior Eurovision Song Contest
Georgia
2022